"Outta Time" is a song by American singer Bryson Tiller featuring Canadian-American musician Drake, from Tiller's third studio album, Anniversary. Produced by frequent Drake collaborators Vinylz, Nineteen85 and 40, the song samples Snoh Aalegra's "Fool for You" and finds the artists reflecting on their respective relationships. Drake is the first featured artist to appear on any of Tiller's studio albums. The song was sent to US urban radio on October 20, 2020, as the third single from Anniversary.

Background
The song is the only track on Tiller's Anniversary with a credited guest appearance, as he brought in the services of Drake to contribute a verse. Tiller revealed that Drake was due to collaborate with him five years earlier on Tiller's 2015 album Trapsoul, but the plans fell through and he had been trying to sort out a collaboration ever since. Tiller, despite being impressed by Drake's contribution, was hesitant to release the song because of his mental state, until his manager heard it and urged him to include it on Anniversary. The song was originally meant for Tiller's upcoming project, Serenity. Drake had shown support toward Tiller before the release of Trapsoul, and at one point wanted to sign him to OVO, following the success of Tiller's song, "Don't".

Tiller first played the song during a surprise Zoom listening session shortly before the album's release.

Composition and lyrics
"Outta Time" consists of a "sensual and airy" beat, with a pitched up sample of Snoh Aalegra's "Fool for You", sang by R&B artist Tone Stith, which is transformed into another instrument in the mix. The song does not have a chorus, finding the artists detailing their failing romantic relationships, which they eventually decide to end.

Critical reception
HotNewHipHops Noor Lobad said, because the song lacks a hook, it "narrowly miss[es] out on being able to claim the album's pinnacle, and lowering the song's overall sing-along friendliness". Dre D. of the same publication named the track a standout from its parent album, and said considering how long they have teased a collaboration (since 2017), it is "fitting, then, that the sole feature on Anniversary is none other than Drake himself".

Chart performance
"Outta Time" has peaked at number six on the New Zealand Hot Singles chart, and also reached number 24 on the UK Singles Chart in its first week on both charts.

Charts

Certifications

Release history

References

2020 singles
2020 songs
Bryson Tiller songs
Songs written by Bryson Tiller
Drake (musician) songs
Songs written by Drake (musician)
Song recordings produced by 40 (record producer)
Songs written by 40 (record producer)
Song recordings produced by Nineteen85
Songs written by Nineteen85
Song recordings produced by Vinylz
Songs written by Vinylz
RCA Records singles